Tales of Wonder may refer to:
 Tales of Wonder (magazine), a science fiction magazine published from 1937 to 1942
 Tales of Wonder (album), an album by White Heart
 The Last Book of Wonder or Tales of Wonder, a 1916 short story collection written by Lord Dunsany